David Dusa (born May 17, 1979 in Budapest, Hungary) is a Hungarian and Swedish film director.

Biography
Dusa grew up in Sweden, and after working in fish factories in northern Norway, he settled in France in 2001.

In 2004, he completed his studies at the French CLCF in Paris, and travelled for six months in Asia. He worked for the American documentary director Peter Friedman, and founded the 'Realise' production company with him. Between 2006 and 2009, Dusa directed six short-length movies, winning awards in Festivals all around the world, including the UIP Award at the Rotterdam International Film Festival, and the Onda Curta Award at the Vila Do Conde Festival. In 2008-2009, he assisted Andrew Kötting on directing Ivul, and then edited the movie, an official selection at the Locarno Film Festival.

In June 2009, following the riots that took place in Iran, Dusa wrote Flowers of Evil. The movie premiered at the 2010 Cannes Film Festival (ACID selection) and won the '10 European Directors To Watch Award' delivered by Variety and European Film Promotion. Flowers of Evil was released in France on February 8, 2012.

Ever since, Dusa has been working on two fictional films currently in development: Cacheux Malor, and The Netocracy. He is also developing a TV-series, Paradise Institute, in collaboration with Mike Sens, and works as a playwright for Belgian choreographer Wim Vandekeybus, on the creation of his next show, Radical Wrong. He has also co-written the screenplay to Galloping Mind with him, which is currently in production.

Filmography

Feature film
 2011 : Flowers of Evil

Short film
 2009 : Emeutes des Emotions
 2009 : Rushes Instables
 2009 : Wild Beast
 2008 : Distances
 2007 : Amin
 2006 : Machine

Awards and nominations

References

External links
 

Swedish film directors
Swedish screenwriters
Swedish male screenwriters
1979 births
Living people
Hungarian emigrants to Sweden
Writers from Budapest